Judge Robinson may refer to:

Aubrey Eugene Robinson Jr. (1922–2000), judge of the United States District Court for the District of Columbia
Beth Robinson (born 1965), judge of the United States Court of Appeals for the Second Circuit
Julie A. Robinson (born 1957), judge of the United States District Court for the District of Kansas
Mary Lou Robinson (1926–2019), judge of the United States District Court for the Northern District of Texas
Richard Earl Robinson (1903–1991), judge of the United States District Court for the District of Nebraska
Spottswood William Robinson III (1916–1998), judge of the United States Court of Appeals for the District of Columbia Circuit
Stephen C. Robinson (born 1957), judge of the United States District Court for the Southern District of New York
Sue Lewis Robinson (born 1952), judge of the United States District Court for the District of Delaware
Todd W. Robinson (born 1967), judge of the United States District Court for the Southern District of California
Wilkes C. Robinson (1925–2015), judge of the United States Court of Federal Claims

See also
Justice Robinson (disambiguation)